Stanley Leigh (27 December 1901 – June 1986) was a British gymnast. He competed at the 1920 Summer Olympics and the 1924 Summer Olympics.

References

External links
 

1901 births
1986 deaths
British male artistic gymnasts
Olympic gymnasts of Great Britain
Gymnasts at the 1920 Summer Olympics
Gymnasts at the 1924 Summer Olympics
Sportspeople from Swansea